"If I Could Only Win Your Love" is a song written and first performed in 1958 by The Louvin Brothers and later made a hit by American country music artist Emmylou Harris. Harris and Herb Pedersen sing this as a duet, much like Charlie and his brother Ira sang it originally.  It was released in June 1975 as the second single from her album Pieces of the Sky. The song peaked at number 4 on the Billboard Hot Country Singles chart. It also reached number 1 on the RPM Country Tracks chart in Canada.

Chart performance

References

1975 singles
1958 songs
Emmylou Harris songs
Song recordings produced by Brian Ahern (producer)
Reprise Records singles
Year of song missing
Songs written by Ira Louvin
Songs written by Charlie Louvin